Paul Abraham Jordaan (born 4 January 1992) is a South African rugby union footballer. His regular playing position is either fly-half or centre. He represents  in the French Top 14.

He was a member of the South Africa Under 20 team that competed in the 2011 IRB Junior World Championship and won the 2012 tournament.

References

External links
 
 itsrugby.co.uk profile
 IRB profile

Living people
1992 births
South African rugby union players
Sharks (rugby union) players
Sharks (Currie Cup) players
Rugby union centres
People from the Western Cape
Afrikaner people
South African people of Dutch descent
Alumni of Grey College, Bloemfontein
South Africa international rugby sevens players
South Africa Under-20 international rugby union players